Tathra Rugby League Football Club is an Australian rugby league football club in Tathra, New South Wales, formed in 1926. It has teams for both juniors and seniors competitions. 

Two early records name players in the Pambula team to play Tathra in June and August 1927.

In 1929, Tathra played a match against Candelo.

In the 2018 season, the club fielded Reserve Grade and Ladies League Tag teams. The club was most recently in First Grade from 2009 to 2014.

In 2019, the club won the Group 16 Premiership for the first time in 66 years.

References 

Rugby league teams in New South Wales
South Coast (New South Wales)
Rugby clubs established in 1926